Thomas Marsh Nelson (c. 1817 - 24 February 1884) was an English architect who worked principally in London. He was particularly active in the development of Westbourne Terrace in the 1840s on behalf of the builder William Kingdom.

Early life and family
Thomas Marsh Nelson was born around 1817 in London. His family were involved in slavery in the West Indies. He married Julia Satara Briggs, daughter of General John Briggs and Jane Dodson, on 10 November 1852 at St. George Hanover Square, London.

Career
In 1838 he gave evidence before the Select Committee of the House of Commons on Metropolis Improvements in relation to the need for new streets in the centre of London to improve traffic flow. In 1841 he was living or working from 3 Charles Street, St James, London. He was in partnership with Charles Innes.

Later life
Nelson was made bankrupt in 1881 when he was living at 6 Comeragh Road, Baron's Court Road, West Kensington. He died on 24 February 1884 at West Kensington, London.

Works
 He was appointed by the Victoria Building Company in Great Yarmouth in the 1840s.
St John the Evangelist, Clapham, 1840-42: Grade II listed church, built in a classical style as a chapel of ease
 He was active in Westbourne Terrace in the 1840s on behalf of the builder William Kingdom.
 In 1873 he designed the grade II listed warehouse at 34B York Way, Kings Cross, with William Harvey.

References 

1884 deaths
Architects from London
1810s births